Abderrazak Bounour (born 11 January 1957), also known as Abdel Razzak Bounour, is a retired Algerian long-distance runner who specialized in the 5000 metres.

He was born in Annaba, and represented the club USSN. He reached the semi-final of the 1983 World Championships, as well as at the 1984 Olympic Games. He won the 5000 metres at the 1984 African Championships, and the silver medal in the same event at the 1983 Maghreb Championships.

His personal best times were 7.49.69 minutes in the 3000 metres, achieved in June 1983 in Tampere; 13.25.26 minutes in the 5000 metres, achieved in June 1984 in Firenze; and 28.00.73 minutes in the 10,000 metres, achieved in July 1985 in Stockholm.

International competitions

References

External links
 
 
 

1957 births
Living people
People from Annaba
Algerian male long-distance runners
Olympic athletes of Algeria
Athletes (track and field) at the 1984 Summer Olympics
World Athletics Championships athletes for Algeria
21st-century Algerian people
20th-century Algerian people